Area code 268 is the telephone area code of Antigua and Barbuda.  The 268 area code, or "(ANT)" was created during a split from the original 809 area code which began permissive dialing 1 April 1996 and ended 31 March 1997.

The 268 area code is part of the North American Numbering Plan (NANP).

When in Antigua and Barbuda, use the seven digits alone. When calling to Antigua and Barbuda from anywhere in the United States or Canada simply dial 1(268) + the seven-digit phone number.

One Ring Scam
The 268 area code has been linked to a form of telephone fraud known as the "one ring scam". The person perpetuating the scam calls the victim via a robodialer or similar means, sometimes at odd hours of the night, then hangs up when the phone is answered with the hope that they will be curious enough to call the number back. When the victim does this, an automatic $19.95 international call fee is charged to their account, as well as $9.00 per minute for the duration of the call. Similar scams have been linked to Grenada (area code 473), Jamaica (area codes 876 and 658), the Dominican Republic (area code 809) and the British Virgin Islands (area code 284).

See also 
List of NANP area codes
North American Numbering Plan
Area codes in the Caribbean

References

External links
North American Numbering Plan Administrator
List of exchanges from AreaCodeDownload.com, 268 Area Code

Telecommunications in Antigua and Barbuda
268